Dylan Geick (born September 9, 1997) is an American social media personality, writer, and amateur wrestler. He speaks on his experience as an LGBTQ person in athletics and the army. Geick wrestled for the Columbia Lions from 2017 to 2018. Geick served in the United States Army for a brief period of just over one year, before leaving.

Life and career 
Geick was born on September 9, 1997 in Buffalo Grove, Illinois. At Stevenson High School, Geick was a three-time member of the Illinois Freestyle national team and came in 4th in 152 lb and 160 lb weight divisions at the Illinois High School Sports Association state Championships 2 years in a row. In 2017, Geick self-published Early Works: A Collection of Poetry. He is a YouTuber and speaks on his experience as an out LGBT athlete and Internet celebrity.  For a time Geick was involved in a relationship with fellow YouTuber and internet celebrity Jackson Krecioch. In 2019, Geick helped advise the National Collegiate Athletic Association on its compensation policy.

After his 2017 graduation from Stevenson, Geick went to Columbia University. Shortly after committing to attend, a series of homophobic, sexist, and racist comments surfaced in the wrestling team's GroupMe. The coach, Zach Tanelli, reached out to Geick to condemn the comments. Geick joined the Columbia Lions wrestling team and studied English. In late 2019, Geick went on leave from the school and enlisted in the United States Army. In a March 2021 interview, Geick shared that he was discharging from the military in a few weeks.

, Geick had 678 thousand followers on Instagram, over 200 thousand YouTube subscribers, and 50 thousand followers on TikTok.

Personal life

In 2016, Geick began posting pictures of him with his boyfriend on Instagram and then came out as gay to some schoolmates. He came out to wider audiences in 2017 in an article in Stevenson's school newspaper and a profile in Outsports. From 2017 to 2019, he was in an on-again, off-again relationship with YouTuber .

References

Citations

Bibliography

External links

 

Living people
Place of birth missing (living people)
Sportspeople from Illinois
American wrestlers
American LGBT sportspeople
Poets from Illinois
American LGBT poets
Bisexual men
Bisexual sportspeople
United States Army soldiers
American LGBT military personnel
Military personnel from Illinois
Bisexual military personnel
American YouTubers
LGBT YouTubers
21st-century American male writers
21st-century American poets
American LGBT rights activists
LGBT people from Illinois
Columbia Lions wrestlers
People from Buffalo Grove, Illinois
21st-century LGBT people
1997 births
American bisexual writers